Carmine Parlato (born 7 June 1970) is an Italian football manager and former player, currently working as head coach of Serie D club Cjarlins Muzane.

Career

Playing career
He has played in Serie B with Padova in the season 1990-1991.

Coaching career
He has won three times in the Serie D with Rovigo, Pordenone and Padova. With the Pordenone was also awarded the title of Champion of Italian amateurs.

On 27 September 2016 he was named to coach the Delta Rovigo. At the end of the season it was not reconfirmed.

On 8 August 2017 he was named to coach the Rieti, earning the team a promotion to Serie C.

In June 2018 he is named to coach the Latina. In November of the same year, he left the team.

On 17 June 2019, Parlato was appointed manager of Savoia.

Parlato served as head coach of Serie D club Trento for the 2020–21 season, during which he guided his team to being crowned Girone C champions and winning promotion to Serie C for the first time in 18 years. He successively guided Trento for most of the club's 2021–22 Serie C campaign, before being sacked on 27 March 2022 following a string of negative results.

In July 2022, Parlato returned into management as the new head coach of Serie D club Casertana. On 1 November 2022, Parlato was dismissed due to negative results. Just a few days later, on 10 November, he was signed by Serie D club Cjarlins Muzane.

Honours

Coach
Trento
 Serie D: 2020–21 (Group C)

References

External links
 Profile at Padovacalcio.it by Internet Archive 

1970 births
Living people
Footballers from Naples
Italian footballers
Calcio Padova players
Serie B players
Association football defenders